Giovanni Battista Bracelli or Braccelli is the name of more than one engraver and painter active in central Italy in the Baroque period, between about 1616 and 1649.

According to Stefano Ticozzi, he was born in 1584, became the most valued assistant to Paggi, and died before his twenty-fifth birthday.

A Florentine Giovan Batista Braccelli was a pupil and collaborator of Jacopo da Empoli. He published in 1624 in Livorno a Bizzarie di varie figure, a book of etchings with a dedication to Don Pietro de' Medici (who died in 1604).

Other mentions are of a Florentine Giovanni Battista Bracelli who was a pupil of Giulio Parigi, and another also known as "Brazzé" or "Il Bigio". It is not clear whether these were different people to those above.

A collection of engravings entitled Figure con instrumenti musicali e boscarecci, published in Rome after 1624, also bears the name Giovanni Battista Bracelli, as does a rare Alfabeto figurato published in Naples in 1632.

References

Further reading 

 Simona Sperindei, (2017). 'Nuovi documenti sul pittore ed acquafortista seicentesco Giovan Battista Braccelli'. In: Atti delle giornate di studi "Caravaggio e i suoi" (Monte Santa Maria Tiberina, 2016), a cura di Pierluigi Carofano Pisa. , pages 181–190.

17th-century Italian painters
Italian male painters
Painters from Tuscany
Italian engravers
Italian Baroque painters
1584 births
1609 deaths